Venson is both a given name and a surname. Notable people with the name include:

Lily Venson (1924–2011), American journalist
Pelonomi Venson-Moitoi (born 1951), Botswana politician and journalist
Venson Hamilton (born 1977), American basketball player

See also
Henson (name)